Tarek "Baresi" Lazizi (born June 8, 1971) is a retired Algerian footballer in Finland. He played as a central defender.

Career 
He was nicknamed «Baresi» after Italian defender Franco Baresi and is mostly remembered for his career-ending tackle on USM Alger forward Azzedine Rahim.

Club career
 1981-1982 JS El Biar (Juniors) 
 1982-1987 MC Alger (Juniors) 
 1987-1996 MC Alger 
 1996-1998 Stade Tunisien 
 1998-1999 Gençlerbirliği 
 1999-2002 MC Alger 
 2002-2003 Atlantis FC 
 2003-2005 MB Bouira

International career
Lazizi was capped at all levels by Algeria. He received his first call-up to the senior national team in 1989 for a mini-tournament in Cameroon in preparation for the 1990 African Cup of Nations. He scored 2 goals for the national team, the first in the 1st leg match of the 1991 Afro-Asian Cup of Nations match against Iran, the second in the quarter-finals of the 1996 African Cup of Nations against South Africa.

Honours
Country:
 Won the African Cup of Nations in 1990
 Won the Afro-Asian Cup of Nations in 1991
 Has 35 caps and 2 goals for the Algerian National Team
 Participated in 2 editions of the African Cup of Nations: 1990 and 1996
Club:
 Won the Algerian league once with MC Alger in 1999
Personal:
 Chosen as the Best Foreign Player in the Tunisian League in the 1996/1997 season

References

External links

1971 births
Living people
Algerian footballers
Algeria international footballers
Algeria under-23 international footballers
People from El Biar
Expatriate footballers in Finland
Expatriate footballers in Tunisia
Expatriate footballers in Turkey
Gençlerbirliği S.K. footballers
MC Alger players
Stade Tunisien players
Atlantis FC players
1990 African Cup of Nations players
1996 African Cup of Nations players
Algerian expatriate sportspeople in Turkey
Algerian expatriate sportspeople in Tunisia
Algerian expatriates in Finland
JS El Biar players
Africa Cup of Nations-winning players
Association football defenders
21st-century Algerian people